"Still I Dream of It" is a song by American rock band the Beach Boys that was recorded in early 1977. Written by Brian Wilson, the song was written for Frank Sinatra, but was also intended for Stevie Wonder or Elton John, in case Sinatra would reject it. The band recorded the song for their album Adult/Child, which was never released.

In 1993, the track was released on the box set Good Vibrations: Thirty Years of The Beach Boys. A demo version of Brian Wilson singing the song and accompanying himself on piano was included on Wilson's 1995 solo album I Just Wasn't Made for These Times.

Reception
Music journalist Barney Hoskyns called the song's pathos "irresistible."

Personnel
Brian Wilson — vocals, piano

Covers
The song has been covered by Ed Harcourt and was released as a limited edition single, it is also found on the Elephant's Graveyard a collection of Harcourt's B-sides and rarities. Jimmy Nail and Carice van Houten have also covered the song.

References

The Beach Boys songs
1993 songs
Songs written by Brian Wilson
Song recordings produced by Brian Wilson
Brian Wilson songs
The Beach Boys bootleg recordings